Hey, I'm Alive is a 1975 American made-for-television adventure drama film starring Edward Asner and Sally Struthers. It recounts the true story of Helen Klaben and Ralph Flores as described in Klaben's book of the same name.

The director, Lawrence Schiller, photographed the rescue in 1963 for Life magazine. It premiered on ABC on November 7, 1975.

Plot
Two plane crash survivors spend 49 days of winter in the Yukon before they are rescued.

Cast

References

ABC Movie of the Week
1975 television films
1975 films
American films based on actual events
Films about aviation accidents or incidents
American aviation films
Films directed by Lawrence Schiller
1970s American films